Mueang ( mɯ̄ang), Muang ( mɯ́ang, ; Tai Nuea: ᥛᥫᥒᥰ muang), Mong ( mə́ŋ), Meng or Mường (Vietnamese), were pre-modern semi-independent city-states or principalities in mainland Southeast Asia, adjacent regions of Northeast India and Southern China, including what is now Thailand, Laos, Burma, Cambodia, parts of northern Vietnam, southern Yunnan, western Guangxi and Assam.

Mueang was originally a term in the Tai languages for a town having a defensive wall and a ruler with at least the Thai noble rank of khun, together with its dependent villages.
The mandala model of political organisation organised states in collective hierarchy such that smaller mueang were subordinate to more powerful neighboring ones, which in turn were subordinate to a central king or other leader. The more powerful mueang (generally designated as chiang, wiang, nakhon or krung – with Bangkok as Krung Thep Maha Nakhon) occasionally tried to liberate themselves from their suzerain and could enjoy periods of relative independence. Mueang large and small often shifted allegiance, and frequently paid tribute to more than one powerful neighbor – the most powerful of the period being Ming China.

Following Kublai Khan's defeat of the Dali Kingdom of the Bai people in 1253 and its establishment as a tutelary state, new mueang were founded widely throughout the Shan States and adjoining regions – though the common description of this as a "mass migration" is disputed. Following historical Chinese practice, tribal leaders principally in Yunnan were recognized by the Yuan as imperial officials, in an arrangement generally known as the Tusi ("Native Chieftain") system. Ming and Qing-era dynasties gradually replaced native chieftains with non-native Chinese government officials.

In the 19th century, Thailand's Chakri dynasty and  Burma's colonial and subsequent military rulers did much the same with their lesser mueang, but, while the petty kingdoms are gone, the place names remain.

Place names
Place names in Southwestern Tai languages

Cambodia
In Khmer, "moeang" (មឿង) is a word borrowed from the Thai language meaning "small city" or "small town." Usually used as a place name for villages.
 Angkor Moeang
 Moeang Char
 Moeang Prachen

China

Laos
Laos is colloquially known as Muang Lao, but for Lao people, the word conveys more than mere administrative district. The usage is of special historic interest for the Lao; in particular for their traditional socio-political and administrative organisation, and the formation of their early (power) states, described by later scholars as Mandala (Southeast Asian political model). Provinces of Laos are now subdivided into what are commonly translated as districts of Laos, with some retaining Muang as part of the name:
Muang Sing 
Muang Xay
Former Muang
Muang Phuan (modern Phonsavan, capital city of Xiangkhouang Province)
Muang Sua

Myanmar
 
Mong Mao
Mong Hsat
Mong Hpayak
Mong Ton
Mong Nai
Mong Ping
Mohnyin (former Mongyang State)
Mogaung (former Mongkawng)
Momauk
Mogok
Momeik

Northeast India
 Ahom kingdom – The Mueang (currently the states of Assam and Arunachal Pradesh in North-East India), established by a Tai Prince Sukaphaa in 1228 with 9000 Tai People migrated from Mong Mao called as Ahom by local people, transformed itself into a huge kingdom by the 17th century that withstood the might of the Mughal Empire.

Thailand 

Thailand is colloquially known as Mueang Thai. After the Thesaphiban reforms of Prince Damrong Rajanubhab, city-states under Siam were organized into monthon (Thai translation of mandala), which was changed to changwat in 1916. 
Mueang still can be found as the term for the capital districts of the provinces (amphoe mueang), as well as for a municipal status equivalent to town (thesaban mueang). In standard Thai, the term for the country of Thailand is ประเทศไทย, rtgs: Prathet Thai.

Mueang toponyms 
Mueang still forms part of the placenames of a few places, notably Don Mueang District, home to Don Mueang International Airport; and in the Royal Thai General System of Transcription Mueang Phatthaya for the self-governing municipality of Pattaya.

Nakhon mueang 
Nakhon as meaning "city" has been modified to thesaban nakhon, usually translated as "city municipality". It still forms part of the name of some places.
 Krung Thep Maha Nakhon
 Phra Nakhon Si Ayutthaya
 Nakhon Lampang
 Nakhon Nayok 
 Nakhon Ratchasima
 Nakhon Si Thammarat
 Nakhon Thai
 Renu Nakhon

Buri mueang 

Sung Noen District is noted for having been the site of two ancient cities: Mueang Sema and Khorakhapura. Pali púra became Sanskrit puri, hence Thai , (buri) all connoting the same as Thai mueang: city  with  defensive wall. "Khorakhapura" was nicknamed "Nakhon Raj," which as a portmanteau with Sema, became Nakhon Ratchasima. Though dropped from the name of this mueang, Sanskrit buri persists in the names of others.
 Buriram
 Chonburi
 Sing Buri
 Suphan Buri
 Thonburi

Vietnam

Muong Cha
Muong La
Mường Lay
Muong Lat 
Muong Khuong
Muong Nhe
Muong Te
Muong Thanh

Etymology
NB: Luo et al. employ /ü/ which may erroneously scan as /ii/.

Müang Fai irrigation system  
Müang Fai is a term reconstructed from Proto-Tai, the common ancestor of all Tai languages. In the Guangxi-Guizhou  of Southern China region, the term described what was then a unique type of irrigation engineering for wet-rice cultivation. Müang meaning 'irrigation channel, ditch, canal' and Fai, 'dike, weir, dam.' together referred to gravitational irrigation systems for directing water from streams and rivers. 
The Proto-Tai language is not directly attested by any surviving texts, but has been reconstructed using the comparative method. This term has Proto-Tai-tone A1. All A1 words are rising tone in modern Thai and Lao, following rules determined for tone origin. Accordingly, the term is:
in modern  
in modern .  (NB: SEAlang Library's Lao entry omits tonal marking –  a typographical error.) 
Different linguistic tones give different meanings; scholarship has not established a link between this term and any of the terms which differ in tone.

Origin of mueang 
Mueang conveys many meanings, all having to do with administrative, social, political and religious orientation on wet-rice cultivation. The origin of the word mueang yet remains obscure. In October 2007, The National Library of Laos, in collaboration with the Berlin State Library and the University of Passau, started a project to produce the Digital Library of Lao Manuscripts. Papers presented at the Literary Heritage of Laos Conference, held in Vientiane in 2005, have also been made available. Many of the mss. illuminate the administrative, social, political, and religious demands put on communities in the same watershed area that insured a high degree of cooperation to create and maintain  irrigation systems (müang-faai) – which probably was the primary reason for founding mueang.

Kham Mueang 
Kham Mueang is the modern spoken form of the old Northern Thai language that was the  language of the kingdom of Lan Na (Million Fields). Central Thai may call northern Thai people and their language Thai Yuan. They call their language Kham Mueang in which Kham means language or word; mueang; town, hence the meaning of "town language," specifically in contrast to those of the many hill tribe peoples in the surrounding mountainous areas.

See also 
 Acequia, Spanish term for irrigation system organized like the Müang Fai irrigation system 
 Chiang (place name)
 Internal colonialism
 Tusi
 Wiang

References

Former countries in Southeast Asia
Former countries in Thai history
Former countries in Chinese history
Subdivisions of Laos
Subdivisions of Myanmar
Subdivisions of Thailand
Thai words and phrases
Types of administrative division